Representative Council elections were held in Gabon in December 1946 and January 1947.

Electoral system
The Representative Council consisted of 30 members, of which 12 were elected by the First College and 18 by the Second College.

Results
The Second College seats were won by candidates nominated after the French authorities had consulted with traditional chiefs.

References

1946 elections in Africa
1947 elections in Africa
1946 in Gabon
1947 in Gabon
1946 3
1946